Otitoma metuloides is a species of sea snail, a marine gastropod mollusk in the family Pseudomelatomidae, the turrids and allies.

Description

Distribution
This marine species occurs off Zululand, South Africa. These marine creatures are found in the bottom most part of the sea. The scientific name of the species was first validly published in 1995 by Kilburn. Otitoma metuloides form shallow marine sediments. It is a predator. It has sexual reproduction.

References

External links
  Tucker, J.K. 2004 Catalog of recent and fossil turrids (Mollusca: Gastropoda). Zootaxa 682:1-1295
 Kilburn R.N. (2004) The identities of Otitoma and Antimitra (Mollusca: Gastropoda: Conidae and Buccinidae). African Invertebrates, 45: 263-270
  Morassi M., Nappo A. & Bonfitto A. (2017). New species of the genus Otitoma Jousseaume, 1898 (Pseudomelatomidae, Conoidea) from the Western Pacific Ocean. European Journal of Taxonomy. 304: 1-30

Endemic fauna of South Africa
metuloides
Gastropods described in 1995